There have been over 830 rugby league footballers who have been selected to represent Australia since the nation first started playing international matches in 1908. The Australian Rugby League administered the team and maintained the Australian national rugby league team or "The Kangaroos" players register, assigning each player an individual cap number until 2012 when this was taken over by the Australian Rugby League Commission.

The first Kangaroo was Arthur Hennessey, as he was the original captain of the side. The rest were added in alphabetical order, then in order of selection. Inclusion in the Kangaroos register denotes a player's selection for a Kangaroos squad and does not necessarily mean an actual full international appearance was made. The year selected represents the first year in which they were called up for international duties and the appearances represent full international matches. New Zealand players who were selected to play for 'Australasian' representative teams are also included.

Super League test appearances, although counted as such by their overseas counterparts, have been disregarded by the sport's Australian governing body so are excluded from their register.

Kangaroos register

 

 

 

 
 
 

The year in which a player was first selected in an Australian squad.
The club a player was with when he was first selected.
The total number of matches played for Australia against other national sides.
Total does not include additional Super League test matches.

Super League representatives
During the split season of 1997, the Australian Super League organisation held internationals with New Zealand and Great Britain. These are considered bona fide test matches by the British Rugby Football League, the New Zealand Rugby League and Rugby League International Federation but are excluded from the Australian Rugby League's records.

Also played for The Australian Kangaroos.

See also

Australian rugby league's 100 greatest players
Australian rugby league's team of the century
List of Australian Jillaroos team players

References

Sources
Andrews, Malcolm (2006) The ABC of Rugby League, Austn Broadcasting Corpn, Sydney
Whiticker, Alan & Hudson, Glen (2006) The Encyclopedia of Rugby League Players, Gavin Allen Publishing, Sydney
Australia - Players at rugbyleagueproject.com
 Middleton, David Rugby League Yearbook 1987-88 (1988), Lester Townsend Publishing Sydney

 
 
Australia